Seoul Independent Film Festival (서울獨立映畵祭, 서울독립영화제, SIFF) is an independent film festival in Republic of Korea. The Seoul Independent Movie Festival is jointly held by the Korean Film Council and the Association of Korean Independent Film & Video. Every winter, this festival is held in Seoul. This film festival hosted by Korean Film Council was started as Korean Youth Film Festival in 1975.

The 47th Seoul Independent Film Festival was held from November 25 to December 3, 2021. A total number of 1550 films were submitted for the festival. From this festival a new award 'CGK Award' supported by the 'Korean Cinematographer's Guild' is being started, and the Audience Award, which was canceled last year, is being revived.

The 48th Seoul Independent Film Festival was held from December 1 to December 9, 2022. A total number of 1574 films were submitted for the festival. 127 films including the opening film The Wind Blows Again by Kim Tae-il and Joo Joo-mi were screened. The opening ceremony was hosted by Kwon Hae-hyo, and Gong Min-jeung and Seo Hyun-woo closed the festival.

History
Festival's name had changed to Film Festival of Golden Crown Awards in 1989. It became a Short Film Festival of Golden Crown Awards in 1994, then changed its name to Korean Youth Short Film Awards in 1998. In 1999, it was transformed into Independent Film Festival Competition, Korean Independent Short Film Festival, after Korean Film Council was established. From 2002, Korean Independent Film Association cosponsored this festival and the film festival's name was changed to Seoul Independent Film Festival. Korean Independent Film Council has organized this film festival from 2010.

The festival features a national independent film competition and gives awards regardless of theme, type, and length throughout varied genres including plays, experiential documentaries, and animated films. Also, the individual invitation program plans to introduce a variety of trends regarding independent movies. Contemporary indie film makers will gather up to envision a movie reflecting the spirit of the age and to find a good alternative to the existing films.

The Seoul Independent Movie Festival runs on a daily basis, which has been constantly expanded to distributing channels for Independent films. The business aims to offer practical and realistic support for pre-production, distribution, and marketing in order to nurture the best independent film talent.

Organization 
Korean Independent Film Council has hosted Seoul Independent Film Festival. And the festival's supervision is an executive committee of Seoul Independent Film Festival.

Purpose 
Seoul Independent Film Festival has 5 purposes. First, it assesses independent films made during a year and suggests a new vision. Second, it induces qualitative improvement of independent films. And, it attempts to meet with audience actively. Also, it arranges a place that encourage new attempt and challenge of independent film. Lastly, it inspires creative consciousness introducing foreign independent film.

Character  
It is competition film festival for all genres of Korean independent films. It invites public participation and presents awards without distinction of genre or time. Also it announces diverse experiences of independent films through the separate invitation section.

Program 

Screening program of Seoul independent film festival is composed of three parts that are domestic competitive section, domestic invitation of the section and foreign invitation of the section. Each section is composed of a full-length film or a short film by standard of 1hour.

There is 3 parts of program. It is a Domestic part in the competition. It is a work that selected by the preliminaries commission through contest. Another is a Domestic part in the invitation. It is a Korean work that planned and invited by Seoul Independent Film Festival. The other part is a Foreign part in the invitation. It is a Foreign work that planned and invited by Seoul Independent Film Festival.

Award 
The festival has 2 sorts of award. One is the Main Prize. The other is a Special Prize.

Main Prize 
Main Prize has 4 types of prize. The Grand Prize is selecting to Grand prize work in competition and award cash prize, plaque. Next, the Best Picture Award is a selecting to Grand prize work in competition and award cash prize, plaque. And the Excellent picture award is selecting to superb work in competition and award cash prize, plaque. Last, the Independent Star Award is selecting to two parts, actors and staffs, in competition and award cash prize, plaque.

Special Prize 
Special Prize has 2 types of prize. The Audience award is presenting to work that receive favorable comment by audience's vote and award cash prize, plaque. And, Self-righteous man award is selected by Korean Independent Film Association's operating committee and award cash prize, plaque.

Awards
Final Feature Competition
 Grand Prize: A prize of  million and a plaque are awarded to the grand prize film.
Best Picture Award:  million in prize money and a plaque are awarded to the best film.
Final Short Competition
Grand Prize: A prize of  million and a plaque are awarded to the grand prize film.
Best Short Film Award:  million in prize money and a plaque are awarded to the best film.
 Best Short Film Award:  million in prize money and a plaque are awarded to the best films.
 New selection section
 New choice: A prize of  million and a plaque is awarded to selected works from among the screenings in the new selection category.
 New perspective: A prize of  million and a plaque is awarded among the films screened in the new selection category.
Special prize
 Independent Star Award: In the final competition, one actor from each of the feature films and short films is selected and awarded with a prize money of  million and a plaque.
 Passionate Staff Award: One of the staff who participated in the screening of the feature film in the final competition will be selected and awarded  million in prize money and a plaque.
CGK Cinematography Award
 Chief Directors Guild Award: A prize of  million and a plaque are awarded to one of the filming staff who participated in the screening of the feature film and short films in the final competition.
Solitary General Award(G) The Korea Independent Film Association Steering Committee selects from among the final competition categories and awards  million in prize money and a plaque.
Executive Committee Special Award The Seoul Independent Film Festival 2021 executive committee selects from among the participants of all screened films and award  million in prize money and a plaque.
 Audience Award Among all screened films, a prize of  million and a plaque is awarded to the feature films and short films that received the highest acclaim through audience votes.

Distribution of work 
There are 3 distribution ways of work. First is a 'Circular screening(indie picnic)'. Prize-winning works and showing works are screened at tour showing with Seoul Independent Film Festival's local network. Next is an 'Online screening'. Prize-winning works and showing works are screened at online showing, planned by Seoul Independent Film Festival. The last is a 'DVD production'. A work which selected from prize-winning works and showing works will sale planning DVD.

Organisation of festival

2021 - present
 The 47th Seoul Independent Film Festival (2021)  
 November 26 - December 3, 2021
 Festival Venues: CGV Art House Apgujeong, CGV Apgujeong
 Host: Korea Independent Film Association, Film Promotion Committee
 Characteristic: It is a domestic competitive independent film festival that encompasses and re-examines various independent films made during the year.
 Slogan 2021: Back to Back, back to back, moving forward
 Opening ceremony MC: Kwon Hae-hyo and Ryu Si-hyeon
 Closing ceremony hosted by Seo Hyun-woo and Lee Sang-hee
 Films screened:1550 films
 Opening Film: Sprinter (Choi Jeong-yeon, South Korea)
 Awardees:
Final Feature Competition
Grand Prize: From Home, To Home by Hye-won JiBest Picture Award: Hot Day and Cold Night by director Park Song-yeolFinal Short Competition
 Grand Prize:Cut and Paste by Kim Hyo-joonBest Short Film Award: City Bag by Hwang Seon-youngBest Short Film Award: Barrens by Lee Tak New selection section
 New choice: The Corner by ShinseonNew Perspective Award: Survival Tactics by Park Geun-young 
Independent Star Award: Lim Seon-woo and Jo Min-kyung of Severance Pay and Two Women Wearing the Same Underwear
 Passionate Staff Award: Chosun Hong for the sound design of Melting Ice Cream
CGK Cinematography Award Kim Woo-young of The Barrens
Executive Committee's Special Award: Yang Young-hee for Soup and Ideology

2022
 The 48th Seoul Independent Film Festival (2022)  
 December 1 — December 9, 2022
 Festival Venues: CGV Art House Apgujeong, CGV Apgujeong
 Host: Korea Independent Film Association, Film Promotion Committee
 Characteristic: It is a domestic competitive independent film festival that encompasses and re-examines various independent films made during the year.
 Slogan 2022: The Art of Love
 Opening ceremony MC: Kwon Hae-hyo 
 Closing ceremony hosted by Gong Min-jung and Seo Hyun-woo
 Films screened:127 films
 Opening Film: The Wind Blows Again (Kim Tae-il and Joo Joo-mi, South Korea)
 Awardees:
Final Feature Competition
Grand Prize: Monster by Lee Jeong-hongBest Picture Award: The Fifth Thoracic Vertebra by director Park Se-youngFinal Short Competition
 Grand Prize:Reparation by Yang Jae-joonBest Short Film Award: Engraving by Kim Min-kyungBest Short Film Award: A Cup of Tea with Mr. Park Young-gil by Yoo Woo-il New selection section
 New choice:  'Two People by Ban Park Ji-eunNew Perspective Award: Groping the Elephant's Hind Legs by Kim Nam-seok 
New Choice Award special mention: Mother's Land by Park Jae-beom 
Independent Star Award: Sohn Soo-hyun and Ki-yoon of Heomchan Grows Up and Archaeology of Love
 Passionate Staff Award: Lee Jin-geun for the cinematographer of Connecting Land
CGK Cinematography Award Kim Lee Jin-geun of The Land of Continuing
Executive Committee's Special Award: Travel Lee Ha-ram and Little Garden by Lee Mario
General Award: ''Archaeology of Love by Lee Wan-Min Audience Award: Sura by Hwang Yoon and Seoul Theater'' by Kim Tae-yang

See also
 Busan International Film Festival

References

External links 
 
 Facebook page of Seoul Independent Film Festival

Awards established in 1975
Recurring events established in 1975
Annual events in South Korea
Film festivals in Seoul
Winter events in South Korea